Susan Cox may refer to:

 Susan Cox (diplomat), Australian diplomat
 Susan Cox (Civil War nurse), Union nurse during the American Civil War
 Susan Cox (artist) (born 1952), American painter